Shekarlui, also rendered as Shekarlu or Shokorlu, may refer to:
 Shekarlui-ye Olya

See also
 Shekarlu Khaleseh